Bunne is a village in the Dutch province of Drenthe. It is a part of the municipality of Tynaarlo, and lies about 11 km south of Groningen.

History 
The village was first mentioned in 1206 or 1207 as Bonne. It could either mean "settlement of Bunne (person) or "settlement on a height". Bunne developed as an esdorp. There used to be a small nun monastery in the village called "Het Huys van Bunne".

Bunne was home to 110 people in 1840. In 1896, a cooperative dairy factory opened in the village. It closed in 1968, and was converted into a metal construction company in 1971. The chimney was demolished in 1980.

Notable people 
  (1949-2020), racing cyclist

Gallery

References

Populated places in Drenthe
Tynaarlo